Wong Chung-chun (31 May 1955) is a Taiwanese politician.

Education
Wong attended high school in Tainan and earned a bachelor's degree in journalism from Chinese Culture University. He obtained a master's degree in international business administration from CCU. then received an EMBA from National Taiwan University. Wong has taught at the Tatung Institute of Technology.

Political career
Wong served two terms on the Chiayi County Council prior to his election to the Legislative Yuan in 1989. He won reelection in 1992 and again in 1995. During the 1995 campaign, Wong became one of the first candidates to receive a patent for his likeness, which he used on many different trinkets. Having won three consecutive elections as a Kuomintang representative of Chiayi County, Wong was placed on the party list for the 1998 elections, which he also won. It was reported in January 2001 that Wong had let his Kuomintang membership lapse, but later that year, he was named Kuomintang candidate for the magistracy of Chiayi County, losing the office to Chen Ming-wen in a three-way race. Entrepreneur Su Hui-chen stated in September 2002 that Wong had helped her bribe legislators in 1998, though Wong denied involvement. He was indicted by the Taipei District Prosecutors' Office in February 2003 and charged with corruption.

Wong returned to the legislature in 2005, and was named a Kuomintang candidate for 2008. Shortly after defeating Democratic Progressive Party candidate Tsai Chi-fang, Wong was elected Economics Committee convenor, alongside Chiu Ching-chun. In March, Kuanshih, Shuishang leader Lai Chun-an was convicted of electoral fraud in support of Wong's campaign. Wong ran in the 2009 Chiayi County magisterial election, and lost to Helen Chang. In his 2012 legislative campaign, Wong made greater use of social media. He defeated Tsai Yi-yu, the son of Tsai Chi-fang, in 2012. He contested the Chiayi County magistracy for the third time in 2014, and again lost to Helen Chang. Wong was ranked fourteenth on the Kuomintang preliminary party list for the 2020 legislative elections. The list was subsequently revised, and Wong's inclusion confirmed.

References

1955 births
Living people
Members of the 1st Legislative Yuan in Taiwan
Members of the 2nd Legislative Yuan
Members of the 3rd Legislative Yuan
Members of the 4th Legislative Yuan
Members of the 6th Legislative Yuan
Members of the 7th Legislative Yuan
Members of the 8th Legislative Yuan
Members of the 10th Legislative Yuan
Chiayi County Members of the Legislative Yuan
Party List Members of the Legislative Yuan
Kuomintang Members of the Legislative Yuan in Taiwan
Chinese Culture University alumni
National Taiwan University alumni